Kovačić (Serbo-Croatian), alternatively spelled Kovačič in Slovene and Slovak (feminine (Slovak): Kovačičová), Kovacsics in Hungarian, or transliterated as Kovacic/Kovacich/Kovachich in English, is one of the most common surnames in Croatia, Slovenia, as well as Hungary and Serbia. Etymologically it is a patronymic derivative of the surname Kovač, which is a Slavic cognate of the English surname Smith, and as such is closely related to the similar surname Kovačević.

In Croatia the form Kovačić is more common than Kovač, whereas in Slovenia it is the other way around. There are around 12,000 people with this surname in Croatia, making it the 7th most common in the country.

It may refer to:

 Anikó Kovacsics (b. 1991), Hungarian handballer
 Ante Kovačić (1854–1889), Croatian writer
 Antun Kovacic (born 1981), Australian footballer
 Bruno Kovačić (b. 1967), Croatian musician
 Dieter Kovačič (b. 1973), real name of the Austrian musician better known as Dieb13
 Emilio Kovačić (b. 1968), Croatian basketball player
 Igor Kovačić (b. 1979), Serbian sprint canoer
 Ivan Goran Kovačić (1913–1943), Croatian poet
 Lojze Kovačič (1928–2004), Slovenian writer
 Mateo Kovačić (b. 1994), Croatian footballer
 Miklós Kovacsics (b. 1953), Hungarian handball player
 Miljenko Kovačić (1973–2005), Croatian footballer
 Miodrag Kovačić (b. 1965), Serbian weightlifter
 Peter Kovačič Peršin (b. 1945), Slovenian theologian
 Risto Kovačić (1845–1909), Serbian scholar and writer
 Viktor Kovačić (1874–1924), Croatian architect
 William Kovacic, member of the United States Federal Trade Commission
 Zdravko-Ćiro Kovačić (b. 1925), Croatian water polo player

See also

 List of most common surnames in Europe

References

Serbian surnames
Montenegrin surnames
Bosnian surnames
Croatian surnames
Occupational surnames